Charles-Philippe d’Albert Duc de Luynes (30 July 1695 – 2 November 1758) held the title Duke of Luynes from 1712 to 1758. He wrote an important memoir of life at the court of Louis XV.

Early life
Charles-Philippe was a grandson of Charles Honoré d'Albert, duc de Luynes the Duke of Chevreuse. He was a great-great-grandson of the first Duke of Luynes, Charles d'Albert, and his wife Marie de Rohan, one of the leading members of the Fronde. His grandmother Jeanne-Marie Colbert was a daughter of the famous Jean-Baptiste Colbert, Louis XIV's minister of finance.

His great-aunt was Jeanne Baptiste d'Albert de Luynes, the mistress of Victor Amadeus II of Sardinia. A second cousin was Maria Vittoria Francesca of Savoy who lived in France and was the wife of Victor Amadeus I, Prince of Carignan.

Career

Luynes was a Peer of France and cavalry officer. He was part of the intimate group that she called her "gentlefolk" (honnêtes gens). He wrote a journal of historic events and facts about the court, a work which has no pretension of literary merit, but is valuable as a document for the study of the aristocratic society of his time.

Personal life
He was twice married. His first marriage took place on 24 February 1710 to Louise-Léontine de Bourbon (1696–1721), Princess of Neuchatel, a granddaughter of Louis de Bourbon, Count of Soissons. Before her death in 1721, they were the parents of:

 Marie Charles Louis d'Albert de Luynes (1717–1771), who married Thérèse Pélagie d'Albert in 1735. After her death, he married Henriette Nicole d'Egmont-Pignatelli.

In 1732, Charles-Philippe married Marie Brulart; she was the widow of the marquis de Charost, and became lady-in-waiting to the Queen Maria Leszczyńska, the consort of King Louis XV of France.

He died at the Château de Dampierre and was buried at the Église Saint-Sulpice, Paris.

Descendants
Through his son Marie Charles, he was a grandfather of Louis Joseph Charles Amable d'Albert de Luynes, Duke of Luynes (1748–1807), who had an active military and political career like his father.

Ancestry

References

1695 births
1758 deaths
Charles Philippe
French memoirists
House of Albert
Burials at Saint-Sulpice, Paris
18th-century peers of France
French male non-fiction writers
Court of Louis XV
18th-century memoirists